Casey Sandy (born 21 May 1984) is a Canadian gymnast who competed for Penn State from 2006 to 2009. In 2007, Sandy participated in World Championships. In 2008, Sandy was the NCAA all-around national champion. He was discouraged by Canada from trying for a place on its 2008 Olympic team.  In 2009, Sandy was the Canadian national champion. In that year, he also was awarded the Nissen-Emery award (the "Heisman" of men's gymnastics).

Personal
Sandy was born in Montreal, Quebec and has a sister. He is black.

References

1984 births
Anglophone Quebec people
African-American people
Canadian male artistic gymnasts
Gymnasts from Montreal
Living people
Penn State Nittany Lions men's gymnasts